The 2012 European Weightlifting Championships was held at Kepez Basket Hall in Antalya, Turkey from 9 April to 15 April 2012. It was the 91st edition of the event.

Doping
+ Doping test:

13 weightlifters (one or multiple prohibited anabolic steroids):

Hysen Pulaku (Albania)
Hanna Batsiushka (Belarus)
Dimitris Minasidis (Cyprus)
Irakli Turmanidze (Georgia)
Rauli Tsirekidze (Georgia)
Cristina Iovu (Moldova)
Florin Ionut Croitoru (Romania)
Razvan Constantin Martin (Romania)
Oxana Slivenko (Russia)
Gokhan Kilic (Turkey)
Bunyami Sezer (Turkey)
Hatice Yilmaz (Turkey)
Fatih Baydar (Turkey)

Schedule
The competition days were split in A and B groups.

Medal overview

Men

Women

Medals tables 
Ranking by all medals: "Big" (Total result) and "Small" (Snatch and Clean&Jerk)

After doping:

Ranking by "Big" (Total result) medals

Participating countries
275 athletes from 36 countries will participate in the championship.

 (12)
 (3)
 (8)
 (8)
 (1)
 (1)
 (14)
 (5)
 (2)
 (12)
 (2)
 (2)
 (12)
 (12)
 (4)
 (11)
 (14)
 (10)
 (6)
 (2)
 (15)
 Kosovo (1)
 (3)
 (8)
 (10)
 (1)
 (1)
 (15)
 (10)
 (15)
 (10)
 (10)
 (5)
 (15)
 (1)
 (12)

References

External links 
 
Results 

European Weightlifting Championships
European Weightlifting Championships
European Weightlifting Championships
Sport in Antalya
21st century in Antalya
2012 in weightlifting